Valehouse (or Vale House)  Reservoir is a man-made lake in Longdendale in north Derbyshire. It was built between 1865 and 1869 as part of the Longdendale chain, which was built to supply water from the River Etherow to the urban areas of Greater Manchester while maintaining a constant flow into the river. The upper reservoirs supply the drinking water, while Vale House and Bottoms are compensation reservoirs which guarantee the flow of water to water-powered mills downstream. Today 45 megalitres of compensation water are released each day into the River Etherow.

Vale House Mill was purchased by Manchester Corporation in 1864, but a few villagers remained in the village of Vale House until 1868. In 1869 the hamlet was flooded out. The village was substantial, having an estimated population of 600 houses and 100 cottages. There was a gasworks and a school house for 24-30 scholars. Vale House Mill was the first spinning and weaving mill in Longdendale; it was built in 1775 by Samuel Oldknow. In 1864 it was owned by William Hobbs and Co. It had two carding rooms, nine spinning rooms, three weaving rooms and two Blowing Rooms. It had 15,416 spindles and 326 power looms. Vale House residents worshipped at the Ebenezer Methodist Chapel in Tintwistle (built 1830), which was above the reservoir.

The chimney at Vale House Mill survived the construction of the reservoir and became known as the "Whispering Chimney" as it produced ghostly noises during strong winds. It was demolished in 1887 at the request of the Manchester to Sheffield Railway Company, who feared for the stability of their trains when all the passengers crowded over to one side of a carriage to see the chimney protruding from the waters of the reservoir.

It was stated in a statuary report, under the Reservoir Safety Act 1975, dated 12 June 1984, that all five reservoirs could be over-topped during a Probable Maximum Flood, so major works were undertaken. The 11 kV overhead powerline was routed in a new embankment crest duct.

See also 
 List of dams and reservoirs in United Kingdom

References 

Reservoirs of the Peak District
Reservoirs in Derbyshire